Bridgewater Historic District may refer to the following historic districts in the United States (by state):

Bridgewater Center Historic District, Bridgewater, Connecticut, listed on the NRHP in Connecticut
East Bridgewater Common Historic District, East Bridgewater, Massachusetts, listed on the NRHP in Massachusetts
Bridgewater Historic District (Bridgewater, Pennsylvania), listed on the NRHP in Pennsylvania
Bridgewater Historic District (Bridgewater, Virginia), listed on the NRHP in Rockingham County, Virginia